Roger Hugh Trigg (born 14 August 1941) is a British philosopher and Emeritus Professor of Philosophy at the University of Warwick. He is known for his works on philosophy of religion. Trigg has been President of the Mind Association, Founding President of the British Society for the Philosophy of Religion, President of the European Society for Philosophy of Religion, and the first President of the British Philosophical Association.

References

External links
Roger Trigg at the University of Warwick

1941 births
20th-century British philosophers
20th-century Protestants
Academics of the University of Oxford
Academics of the University of Warwick
Alumni of New College, Oxford
Analytic philosophers
British Protestants
Living people
People from Pontypridd
Philosophers of religion
Philosophy academics
Protestant philosophers